Koryak is a Chukotko-Kamchatkan language spoken by about 1,700 people as of 2010 in the easternmost extremity of Siberia, mainly in Koryak Okrug.  It is mostly spoken by Koryaks.  Its close relative, the Chukchi language, is spoken by about three times that number. The language together with Chukchi, Kerek, Alutor and Itelmen forms the Chukotko-Kamchatkan language family. Its native name in Koryak is нымылан nymylan, but variants of the Russian "Koryak" name are most commonly used in English and other languages.

The Chukchi and Koryaks form a cultural unit with an economy based on reindeer herding and both have autonomy within the Russian Federation.

Phonology 

Koryak alphabet

References

Further reading

 Bogoras, Waldemar, and Franz Boas. Koryak Texts. Leyden: E.J. Brill, 1917.
 Comrie, Bernard. Inverse Verb Forms in Siberia Evidence from Chukchee, Koryak and Kamchadal. Amsterdam: Bibliotheek v.h. Inst. voor Algemene Taalwetenschap v.d. Univ. van Amsterdam], 1985.
Zhukova, A. N., 1972. Grammatika Korjakskogo Jazyka: Fonetika, Morfologia. Moscow: Akademia Nauk SSSR. 327pp. (In kyrill. Schrift).
 Zhukova, A. N., and Tokusu Kurebito. Basic topical dictionary of the Koryak-Chukchi languages = Basovyĭ tematicheskiĭ slovarʹ kori︠a︡ksko-chukotskikh i︠a︡zykov. Tokyo, Japan: Research Institute for Languages and Cultures of Asia and Africa, Tokyo University of Foreign Studies, 2004.
 Campbell, George L. and Gareth King. "Compendium of the World's Languages". 2013.

External links

Endangered Languages of Siberia - The Koryak language
Жукова - Корякский язык

Agglutinative languages
Chukotko-Kamchatkan languages
Languages of Russia